Joyal is a surname. Notable people with the surname include:

André Joyal (born 1943), Canadian mathematician
André Joyal (economist), Canadian economist
Dave Joyal (born 1983), American rock drummer
Eddie Joyal (born 1940), Canadian ice hockey player
Glenn Joyal, Manitoba judge
Serge Joyal (born 1945), Canadian senator

See also
Fusing